Freeport is also the former name of the Warren County town of Oregonia.

Freeport is a village in southwestern Harrison County, Ohio, United States. The population was 321 at the 2020 census.

History
Freeport was laid out in 1810. A post office has been in operation at Freeport since 1814.

Geography

Demographics

2010 census
As of the census of 2010, there were 369 people, 161 households, and 87 families living in the village. The racial makeup of the village was 97.6% White and 2.4% from two or more races.

There were 161 households, of which 28.0% had children under the age of 18 living with them, 41.6% were married couples living together, 5.6% had a female householder with no husband present, 6.8% had a male householder with no wife present, and 46.0% were non-families. 39.1% of all households were made up of individuals, and 15.5% had someone living alone who was 65 years of age or older. The average household size was 2.29 and the average family size was 3.16.

The median age in the village was 41.2 years. 23.3% of residents were under the age of 18; 5.5% were between the ages of 18 and 24; 26.3% were from 25 to 44; 27% were from 45 to 64; and 17.9% were 65 years of age or older. The gender makeup of the village was 49.9% male and 50.1% female.

2000 census
As of the census of 2000, there were 398 people, 170 households, and 99 families living in the village. The population density was 664.5 people per square mile (256.1/km2). There were 200 housing units at an average density of 333.9 per square mile (128.7/km2). The racial makeup of the village was 98.49% White, 0.50% Native American, 0.25% Asian, and 0.75% from two or more races.

There were 170 households, out of which 27.6% had children under the age of 18 living with them, 47.1% were married couples living together, 9.4% had a female householder with no husband present, and 41.2% were non-families. 35.9% of all households were made up of individuals, and 22.4% had someone living alone who was 65 years of age or older. The average household size was 2.34 and the average family size was 3.12.

In the village, the population was spread out, with 22.6% under the age of 18, 10.3% from 18 to 24, 27.9% from 25 to 44, 22.1% from 45 to 64, and 17.1% who were 65 years of age or older. The median age was 39 years. For every 100 females there were 85.1 males. For every 100 females age 18 and over, there were 80.1 males.

The median income for a household in the village was $18,558, and the median income for a family was $35,833. Males had a median income of $26,667 versus $14,000 for females. The per capita income for the village was $15,877. About 11.5% of families and 19.4% of the population were below the poverty line, including 23.6% of those under age 18 and 12.9% of those age 65 or over.

Arts and culture
Freeport has a public library, a branch of the Puskarich Public Library.

Education
The village is served by Lakeland Academy, a K-12 public school.

References

Villages in Harrison County, Ohio
Villages in Ohio